T Set or T-Set, a homophone of tea set, may refer to:

 Sydney Trains T set, a class of electric multiple unit train run by Sydney Trains
 T-Set (intravenous therapy), a type of Y-Set (intravenous therapy)
 The T-Set, predecessor to British band Pink Floyd

See also

 
 The Booker T. Set, a 1969 album by Booker T. & the M.G.'s
 Tee-Set, a Dutch pop-rock band
 The Harlequin Tea Set, an Agatha Christie story

Disambiguation pages